The Chernelytsia Castle is a castle built in Chernelytsia, Galicia, Ukraine in 1659 by Bratslav governor Michał Jerzy Czartoryski.

Architecture
Built in a bastion fort style, the castle occupies an area of around 2 hectares, and is protected by defensive walls that are up to 6 meters high and 2.5 meters thick and loopholes for firearms. There are four acute-angled bastions at the corners of the castle. The front façade is decorated with «Pogoń», the coat of arms of the Grand Duchy of Lithuania. The western façade of the gates is decorated with  Piława, Polish coat of arms, located above the stone doors of the gates, followed by the letters E.S.X.C.W.B., meaning "Euphrosyne Stanislavitskaya, princess of Czartorysk, Bratslav governor (wojewoda)" (the second wife of Mikhail Czartoryskiy).

History
In 1672 and 1676, the castle suffered damage during the war with the Turks (also Tatars, Vlachs). The castle played an important role during the Polish–Ottoman War in 1685-1690. It was the largest eastern castle of the Polish–Lithuanian Commonwealth on the right bank of the Dniester River. During the times of the Moldavian crusades of Jan III Sobieski the castle was the storage place of provisions and fodder. Several times the King himself stopped there.

At the turn of the 18th and 19th centuries, the castle was owned by Tsensky.

In 1892, then owner of the castle Samuel Mosberg wanted to rebuild the castle. But the order of Gorodenka Starostats prohibited any construction under the threat of punishment. The castle stopped functioning after the Soviet annexation of Eastern Galicia and Volhynia in 1939.

References

External links 
 
 Castle of Chernelytsia screened from a drone.

Castles in Ukraine
Buildings and structures in Ivano-Frankivsk Oblast
Czartoryski family